Adolphine may refer to:

Adolphine (name), a female name
Methadone